Wineberry may refer to the following plants:

 Aristotelia chilensis, Chilean wineberry
 Aristotelia serrata, a tree which is endemic to New Zealand
 Rubus phoenicolasius, a type of raspberry native to Asia and introduced to North America
 Vaccinium myrtillus, a fruit also called Bilberry